The 2022 New York State Senate election was held on November 8, 2022. Elections were held to elect representatives from all 63 districts across the State of New York. This election coincided with New York elections for the governorship, U.S. Senate, and state assembly, among others. Districts for this election were redrawn following the 2020 United States census. Democrats have held a majority in the New York State Senate since January 2019, as a result of the 2018 elections.

Background
By 2018, the State Senate was the last Republican-controlled body in the New York government. In the 2018 elections, Senate Democrats won control of the chamber from the Republicans. Previously, Republicans had controlled the Senate for all but three years since World War II, with the current era being the Democrats' largest share of New York State Senate seats since 1912.

Prior to the 2020 elections, Democrats held 40 seats in the State Senate, while Republicans held 20 seats and three other seats were vacant. In the 2020 elections, Democrats won 43 State Senate seats.

Predictions

Polling
Senate District 1
General election

Summary of Results

Notes 

Partisan clients

References

Senate
New York State Senate elections
New York Senate